Government Science High School is a public educational institution located at Tejgaon in Dhaka, Bangladesh. It is one of the 24 public schools in Dhaka.

History

In 1954, East Pakistan Government 'experimentally' established 4 Technical High Schools in Pakistan. Govt. Technical High School, Tejgaon was one of them. On that time, each and every responsibility was taken by the headmaster. In 1962, that school was turned into an intermediate college and the rank of headmaster was upgraded to principal. For that reason, the then headmaster Mr. Abdur Razzak was formed headmaster for 18 years. In 1991, the Government of Bangladesh started double shift in 62 secondary schools. And Government Science High School was one of them. On that time it was named Govt. Science College Attached High School. But it was changed to just Government Science High School on 24 December 2019. Those who were served as the position of head teacher -
 Rizia Khatun                        - 1996-1997
 Muhammad Habibullah Khan            - 1998-1999
 Muhammad Abdul Aziz                 - 1999-2000
 Rowshon Aara Begum                  - 2000-2006
 Muhammad Abdul Aziz                 - 2006-2011
 Ruhidash Sharkar (In-charge)        - 2011-2011
 Muhammad Insan Ali                  - 2011-2012
 Kasturi Dutta Majumdar (In-charge)  - 2012-2015
 Muhammad Bahauddin                  - 2015-2015
 Kasturi Dutta Majumdar (In-charge)  - 2015-2015
 Rowshon Akhter                      - 2015-2015
 Kasturi Dutta Majumdar (In-charge)  - 2015-2016
 Azahar Uddin Ahmed (In-charge)      - 2017–2019
 Rahima Akter (In-charge)            - 2019–Present

Daily assembly
Daily assembly plays a great role to raise discipline, unity and loyalty. That is why, before 15 minutes of starting everyday classes, a daily assembly holds for both shifts individually. A daily assembly contains Quran recitations, uptake The National Flag of Bangladesh, repetition The Oath, serving the National Anthem of Bangladesh and some physical exercises. Everyone has to take part in daily assembly every day.

Uniform
From grades 1-3 the uniform is white shirts and navy blue shorts or full-length pants. From grades 4-10 the uniform is full-sleeve or half-sleeve white shirts and navy blue full-length pants. White keds are mandatory for each and every student. For all grades, the embroidered monogram which is given by the school must be attached in the left pocket of the shirt. Both shift have their individual monogram. Morning shift's monogram has the title 'প্রভাতি' which means morning and Day shift's monogram has the title 'দিবা' which means day. And the most essential thing for every student is their own individual ID card which is provided by the school every year.

School magazine

Name of the School Magazine is Shikriti and the editor is Mr. Ramzan Mahmud. The magazine published every 2 year intervals. In those 2 years, the contents of the magazine are collected from each and every classes. Contents are like - Poetry and rhymes, articles, stories, jokes and riddles, drawings etc. Selected contents are published.

School song

তাল-কাহারবা

Scout

Scouts is one of the most renowned co-curricular activities of Government Science High School. This team has a very regular participation in Scout and Cub Scout activities including National Scout Jamboree. In 2004, a student from this institution was awarded President's Scout Award, the highest award for Scouts. Also another student, K.M.Shakrat Ullah, achieved the 'Shapla Cub Award'.

Committees
There are 9 committees to maintain the school properly. And here is a list of those committees.
 
 High Table 
 Discipline Committee
 Tiffin Committee
 Cultural Committee
 Sports Committee
 Magazine Committee
Milad and Mosque Committee
 Cleanliness Committee
 Student Welfare Fund

Notable alumni

See also
 Government Science College, Dhaka

References

External links
 

Schools in Dhaka District
1954 establishments in East Pakistan
Educational institutions established in 1954